Justin Roberts is a Chicago-based American singer-songwriter of children's music. He performs with the Not Ready for Naptime Players. In 2010, his album Jungle Gym was nominated in the "Best Musical Album for Children" category for the 53rd Grammy Awards, Recess was nominated in the same Grammy category in 2013, for the 56th Grammy Awards, and "Lemonade" was nominated in 2017 for the 60th Grammy Awards.
Justin Roberts released a Greatest Hits album in August 2016, and his new album of acoustic original songs, featuring guest Robbie Fulks, was released in October 2016.

History
Justin Roberts was born in Chicago, Illinois in 1969. As a child, he sang in choruses and had an early love of music. Roberts attended Kenyon College at Gambier, Ohio, where he was a member of the Kokosingers, the college's male a cappella group. He formed the indie-folk band Pimentos For Gus with Mike Merz and Tracy Spuehler at Kenyon when he was a freshman in 1988. In 1992, the three members graduated from Kenyon and moved to Minneapolis, where they gained moderate popularity in the Minneapolis indie music scene of the 1990s. Roberts began a second job as a Montessori preschool teacher in 1992, and it was here where he learned his love of children's music. He wrote and performed his first children's songs for the preschool students. When Pimentos For Gus broke up in 1996, he moved back to his hometown of Chicago to attend graduate school, where he was a religious studies major. In December 1996, Roberts sent Liam Davis a tape of original children's songs as a Christmas present. He didn't think much of them, but Davis wanted to record them. In 1997, Roberts quit graduate school to instead focus on children's music and record his first album, Great Big Sun.

He graduated in 1992. He began his music career in the Minneapolis-based indie-rock band Pimentos for Gus, of which he was a founding member. Pimentos for Gus released three separate albums in the 1990s. Roberts decided to moonlight (during the day) as a Montessori preschool teacher. It wasn’t long before Justin began writing and singing songs for a new generation of fans: his students. The kids immediately responded and inspired Justin to record some of his new songs and send them out to a few friends for Christmas. One of the gift recipients was Liam Davis, a college pal and music producer, who suggested that they record the songs professionally.

In 1997, Justin released his first CD, Great Big Sun, and the critics took note. Justin's music was soon being compared to everyone from Elvis Costello and Fountains of Wayne to Paul Simon, Electric Light Orchestra and Nick Lowe. By 2001, Justin was playing music full-time to appreciative crowds. Word spread and shows started selling out. He has played at such renowned venues and festivals as NYC's Symphony Space, DC's National Geographic Live, Los Angeles' Getty Museum, Seattle's Moore Theatre, Lollapalooza and Chicago's Ravinia Festival.

Discography

With Pimentos For Gus
Musica Psycoustica (1993)
The 17-Minute Workout EP (1995)
East of Sweden (1996)

As solo artist
Bright Becomes Blue (1999)

Children's albums
Great Big Sun (1997)
Yellow Bus (2001)
Not Naptime (2003)
Way Out (2004)
Why Not Sea Monsters? Songs From The New Testament (2004)
Why Not Sea Monsters? Songs From The Hebrew Scriptures (2006)
Meltdown! (2006)
Pop Fly (2008)
Jungle Gym (2010)
Lullaby (2012)
Recess (2013)
Greatest Hits (2016)
Lemonade (2016)
Wild Life (2020)
Space Cadet (2022)

Awards and acknowledgements
Roberts is the winner of eight National Parenting Publications (NAPPA) Gold Awards, and eight Parents' Choice Gold Awards.

Not Naptime was included in the Parents' Choice list of the 25 best children's CDs of the past 25 years, and Jungle Gym was MetroKids' top children's CD of 2010. Meltdown, Pop Fly and Jungle Gym were each chosen as the "Number One Children's CD of the Year" by Fids and Kamily, and Roberts' albums have been among Amazon's "Top 10 Children's CDs of the Year" four times. Meltdown was given as an example of the "Best Children's Music of the Past 30 Years" at Time Out NY Kids.

Jungle Gym was nominated for a GRAMMY Award for best album for children in 2010; Recess was nominated for a GRAMMY Award for best album for children in 2013; Lemonade was nominated for a GRAMMY Award for best album for children in 2017.Wild Life was nominated for a GRAMMY Award for Best Children's Music Album in 2021.

References

Further reading
Arthur, Nicole (March 17, 2006). "Justin Roberts Meltdown! Carpet Square Records". The Washington Post.
"Matheson, Whitney (October 24, 2013) " Justin Roberts' kid-friendly 'Recess'". USA TodayGraeber, Laurel (December 14, 2013) "Justin Roberts and the Not Ready for Naptime Players". The New York Times''.

External links

Official website
"An Interview With Songwriter Justin Roberts About His New Album, Pop Fly", Newsvine, April 7, 2008.
"For the Children", profile at Kenyon College website.
Allen, Susie (7 February 2011).  "Divinity alum gets Grammy nomination", University of Chicago.

Living people
21st-century American singers
20th-century American singers
Musicians from Chicago
American children's musicians
Place of birth missing (living people)
Kenyon College alumni
University of Chicago alumni
Year of birth missing (living people)